Zhang Xinyu (born 28 March 1987), also known as Viann Zhang, is a Chinese actress, singer and model.

Biography

Early life
Zhang was born and raised in Kunshan, Jiangsu. She graduated from Wuxi institute of Commerce.

Acting career
Zhang began her career by acting in the historical drama Banner Hero. In 2009, she became the spokeswoman for a national contest of football babes for the 2010 World Cup, and rose to fame in China.

In 2010, Zhang made her film debut in the romance film If You Are the One 2. Some of her notable film roles are in wuxia film Flying Swords of Dragon Gate, and comedy film I Love Hong Kong 2012.

In 2013, Zhang starred in historical drama The Patriot Yue Fei as Liang Hongyu, a Chinese general of the Song Dynasty.  That same year, she starred in the wuxia television series The Demi-Gods and Semi-Devils, based on the novel by the same name by Jin Yong.

In 2014, Zhang played dual roles as Daji and Hu Xian'er in the television series The Investiture of the Gods, adapted from Xu Zhonglin's classical novel Fengshen Yanyi. Following which, she was nominated at the Huading Awards. She gained increased attention for her role as Li Mochou in The Romance of the Condor Heroes, based on the novel The Return of the Condor Heroes by Jin Yong. Also in 2014, she had roles in the historical drama The Empress of China, playing Consort Xiao; and The Deer and the Cauldron, playing Su Quan.

In 2015, Zhang starred in the action comedy romance film Magic Card. She attended the Cannes Film Festival for the premiere of the film, and received attention for her red carpet fashion.

In 2016, Zhang starred alongside Zhu Yilong in Border Town Prodigal, adapted from the classic novel of the same name by Gu Long.

In 2017, Zhang played the female lead in historical drama Song of Phoenix, which focuses on the legendary life of great Chinese poet Qu Yuan from the Warring States Period. The same year, she played the leading role in wuxia drama As Flowers Fade and Fly Across the Sky.

In 2018, Zhang had a supporting role in the historical romance drama Untouchable Lovers, where she played a male role for the first time.

Personal life
Zhang Xinyu married He Jie on August 27, 2018 in Shanghai. They first met while appearing in a Chinese drama Dog Partner''. He Jie is an armed police commander in special operations and held the rank of captain.

Filmography

Film

Television series

Discography

Awards and nominations

References

External links

1987 births
Actresses from Suzhou
Actresses from Jiangsu
Living people
Chinese film actresses
Chinese television actresses
Chinese female models
21st-century Chinese actresses
People from Kunshan